Helen Holt may refer to:

 Helen F. Holt (1913–2015), American politician from West Virginia
 Helen K. Holt (1937–2016), American physicist
 Helen Maud Holt (1858–1937), English actress